Watkins is an unincorporated community in Miller County, in the U.S. state of Missouri. The community lies on a ridge between Barren and Brushy Forks on Missouri Route KK, approximately five miles northwest of Iberia.

History
A post office called Watkins was established in 1904, and remained in operation until 1949. The community has the name of William Shelton Watkins, a pioneer citizen.

References

Unincorporated communities in Miller County, Missouri
Unincorporated communities in Missouri